Highway 49, known locally as the Spirit River Highway, is one of the two short connections from Dawson Creek to the border between B.C. and Alberta. Established in 1975, Highway 49 travels due east for 16 km (10 mi) from Dawson Creek to its connection with Alberta Highway 49, which the highway derives its number from, at the provincial border. This highway is the initial westernmost highway of the Northern Woods and Water Route.

Major intersections 
For south to north. The entire route is in the Peace River Regional District.

References

External links

Canadian Highway Markers

049
Northern Woods and Water Route
Dawson Creek